Kirstie Klingenberg (née James, born 25 May 1989) is a New Zealand track cyclist and former rower. She competed at the 2020 Summer Olympics, in Women's sprint, and Women's team pursuit.

She was a competitor in the women's team pursuit event at the 2017 UCI Track Cycling World Championships, where she won a bronze medal. Kirstie competed at the 2018 Commonwealth Games where she won silver in the team pursuit.

Klingenberg started in rowing but switched to cycling in 2012. She was diagnosed with endometriosis in 2016, and is an ambassador for Endometriosis New Zealand.

Major results
2015
Oceania Track Championships, Invercargill, New Zealand
1st  Team Pursuit (with Holly Edmondston, Alysha Keith, Elizabeth Steel and Philippa Sutton)
2nd Omnium
2016
Oceania Track Championships, Cambridge, New Zealand
2nd Team Pursuit (with Bryony Botha, Alysha Keith and Nina Wollaston)
3rd Individual Pursuit
2017
2017 UCI Track Cycling World Championships
3rd  Team Pursuit (with Racquel Sheath, Rushlee Buchanan, Jaime Nielsen and Michaela Drummond)

Elmhurst Cycling Classic Criterium, Chicago, IL, USA
1st Place

Track Cycling National Championships, Invercargill, New Zealand
1st  Scratch Race
UCI Track Cycling World Cup Milton, Canada
2nd  Team Pursuit
Uci Track Cycling World Cup Santiago, Chile
1st  Team Pursuit
2018
Oceania Cycling Championships, Cambridge, New Zealand
1st  Team Pursuit (with Racquel Sheath, Bryony Botha, Rushlee Buchanan and Michaela Drummond)
1st  Individual Pursuit
1st  Points Race

2018 UCI Track Cycling World Championships, Apdeldoorn, Netherlands
6th Team Pursuit (with Racquel Sheath, Rushlee Buchanan, Bryony Botha and Michaela Drummond)
6th Individual Pursuit
2018 Commonwealth Games, Gold Coast, Australia
2nd  Team Pursuit (with Bryony Botha, Racquel Sheath and Rushlee Buchanan)
5th Individual Pursuit
5th Scratch Race  2019
UCI Track Cycling World Cup Paris, France
2nd  Team Pursuit  UCI Track Cycling World Cup Milton, Canada
3rd  Team Pursuit
UCI Track Cycling World Cup Cambridge, New Zealand
1st  Team Pursuit  
Track Cycling National Championships, Cambridge, New Zealand
1st  Individual Pursuit
1st  Scratch Race
1st  Points Race
2nd Team Pursuit 
2019
Oceania Cycling Championships, Cambridge, New Zealand
1st  Team Pursuit (with Jessie Hodges, Nicole Sheilds and Emily Shearman)
1st  Individual Pursuit
UCI Track Cycling World Cup Cambridge, New Zealand
1st  Team Pursuit  
Track Cycling National Championships, Cambridge, New Zealand
1st  Individual Pursuit
2019 UCI Track Cycling World Championships, Pruskow, Poland
3rd Team Pursuit (with Holly Edmondston, Rushlee Buchanan, Bryony Botha and Michaela Drummond)
4th Individual Pursuit 
2020
2020 UCI Track Cycling World Championships, Berlin, Germany
6th Team Pursuit (with Holly Edmondston, Rushlee Buchanan, Bryony Botha and Jaime Nielsen)

References

External links

Official website

1989 births
Commonwealth Games medallists in cycling
Commonwealth Games silver medallists for New Zealand
Cyclists at the 2018 Commonwealth Games
Living people
New Zealand female cyclists
Cyclists from Auckland
New Zealand track cyclists
Olympic cyclists of New Zealand
Cyclists at the 2020 Summer Olympics
21st-century New Zealand women
Medallists at the 2018 Commonwealth Games
People with Endometriosis